Megasurcula yokoyamai is an extinct species of sea snail, a marine gastropod mollusk in the family Pseudomelatomidae, the turrids and allies.

Distribution
Fossils of this marine species have been found in Middle Miocene strata in Japan.

References

 Otuka, Y., 1934a: Tertiary structures of the northwestern end of the Kitakami mountainland, Iwate Prefecture, Japan. Bulletin of the Earthquake Research Institute, Tokyo Imperial University, vol. 12, pt. 3, pp. 566–638, pls. 44–51

External links
 The University Museum, The University of Tokyo : holotype

yokoyamai
Gastropods described in 1934